Ancylosis imitella is a species of snout moth in the genus Ancylosis. It was described by George Hampson in 1901. It is found in Spain, France, Sardinia, Corsica, Sicily and Albania.

The wingspan is about 22 mm.

References

Moths described in 1901
imitella
Moths of Europe